East Franconian or Mainfränkisch, usually referred to as Franconian in German, is a dialect which is spoken in Franconia, the northern part of the federal state of Bavaria and other areas in Germany around Nuremberg, Bamberg, Coburg, Würzburg, Hof, Bayreuth, Meiningen, Bad Mergentheim, and Crailsheim.

In the transitional area between Rhine Franconian in the northwest and the Austro-Bavarian dialects in the southeast, East Franconian has elements of Central German and Upper German. The same goes only for South Franconian German in adjacent Baden-Württemberg. East Franconian is one of the German dialects with the highest number of speakers.

The scope of East Franconian is disputed, because it overlaps with neighbouring dialects like Bavarian and Swabian in the south, Rhine Franconian in the west and Upper Saxon in the north.

East Franconian is researched by the "Fränkisches Wörterbuch" project in Fürth, which is run by Bayerische Akademie der Wissenschaften and Erlangen-Nuremberg University.

Grouping 
East Franconian is subdivided in multiple different ways.

One view differentiates three major sub-dialects:
  (East Franconian)
  (Upper East Franconian): in the Würzburger Übergangsstreifen, Regnitz-Raum Obermain-Raum, Bayreuther-Raum, Obermain-Raum, Bayreuther-Raum, Nailaer-Raum, Plauener-Raum
  (Lower East Franconian): in the Würzburger-Raum, subdivided in a Northern and Southern part, Coburger-Raum, Henneberger-Raum, Reußischer-Raum
  (South East Franconian)

Another view differentiates two major sub-dialects:
  (East Franconian): in Franken and a part of Baden-Württemberg with Wertheim and Tauberbischofsheim and also in the Vogtland
  (Lower East Franconian): in Unterfranken and in the Coburger and Henneberger Raum
  (Upper East Franconian): in Ober- and Mittelfranken

A third view has:
  (East Franconian)
  (Lower East Franconian)
 : around Meiningen – Suhl – Schmalkalden
  (Lower East Franconian in a stricter sense): hohenlohischer Raum, Würzburger Raum
 : in the Würzburg area
 area between Unterostfränkisch and Oberostfränkisch: 
  (Upper East Franconian): 
  (= ): 

Older sources give the following grouping:<ref>Brockhaus' Konversations-Lexikon. Vierzehnte vollständig neubearbeitete Auflage. In sechzehn Bänden. Fünfter Band. F. A. Brockhaus in Leipzig, Berlin und Wien, 1894, p. 31 (inside of Deutsche Mundarten, p. 27–35; at Google Books), having: „A. Ostfränkisch. [...] 1) Oberfränkisch-Vogtländisch, [...]. 2) Bambergisch, [...]. 3) Ansbachisch, [...]. 4) Hohenlohisch, [...]. 5) Gäuisch im Ochsenfurter Gäu. 6) Würzburgisch, [...]. 7) Schweinfurtisch, [...]. 8) Itzgründisch, [...]. 9) Hennebergisch, [...].“
(Furthermore with „Nürnbergisch“ together with the „Mundart am Regen (Cham)“, „Egerländisch“, „Tepler Mundart“ inside of '„'Oberpfälzisch oder Nordgauisch“ and that inside of „Bayrisch-Österreichisch“)</ref>
  (Upper Franconian) [in a broad sense]
  (South Franconian): in the area of Karlsruhe, Rastatt, Heilbronn, Hall
  (East Franconian) =  (lit. Main Franconian): from the Saxon Vogtland and the Thüringerwald to the eastern Spessart, to the Rhön and near to the Neckar (in Oberfranken, Mittelfranken without Nürnberg, Unterfranken, Vogtland)
 
  = : Itzgrund and around Coburg/Koburg
 : Henneberg, around Meiningen
  or  [sometimes]: Rhön
  (Upper Franconian) [in a middle sense]: in Upper Franconia (Oberfranken) and the Vogtland
 : in parts of Upper Franconia, namely around Bayreuth, Kulmbach and Hof, and in the Vogtland
 : in the Vogtland, around Plauen
  (Upper Franconian) [in a strict sense]: around Hof and Bayreuth
 
 
  [sometimes'', in some older sources classified with Nürnbergisch as Bavarian]
  (Lower Franconian)
 : around Schweinfurt
 : around Würzburg
  (the dialect of Ochsenfurt) = : around Ochsenfurt
 
 : around Tauberbischofsheim

See also 

 Franconia

References

External links 
 Linguistic atlas of Middle Franconia 
 Linguistic atlas of Lower Franconia 
 Bayerische Akademie der Wissenschaft 

German dialects
Languages of Germany
Bavaria
Upper German languages